The prime minister of Portugal is the head of government of Portugal. As head of government, the prime minister coordinates the actions of ministers, represents the Government of Portugal to the other bodies of state, is accountable to parliament and keeps the president informed. The prime minister can hold the role of head of government with the portfolio of one or more ministries.

There is no limit to the number of terms a person can serve as prime minister. The prime minister is appointed by the president of Portugal following legislative elections, after having heard the parties represented in the parliament. Usually, the person named is the leader of the largest party in the previous election, but there have been exceptions over the years.

History 
Since the Middle Ages, some officers of the Portuguese Crown gained precedence over the others, serving as a kind of prime ministers. Over time, the role of principal officer of the Crown fell upon the chanceler-mor (chancellor), the mordomo-mor (mayor of the palace) and the escrivão da puridade (king's private secretary).

The first modern prime minister of Portugal was Pedro de Sousa Holstein, Marquess of Palmela, who was sworn in on 24 September 1834, as Presidente do Conselho de Ministros (President of the Council of Ministers). In 1911, the official title of the prime minister became Presidente do Ministério (President of the Ministry). In 1933, it became again Presidente do Conselho de Ministros.

The present title Primeiro-Ministro (Prime Minister), attributed to the head of the Government of Portugal, was officially established by the Constitution of 1976 after the revolution of 25 April 1974

Officeholders 
The incumbent prime minister of Portugal is António Costa, who took office on 26 November 2015 as the 13th prime minister of the Third Portuguese Republic. The official residence of the prime minister is a mansion next to São Bento Palace, which, in confusion, is also often called "São Bento Palace".

Portuguese prime ministers of the Third Portuguese Republic:
 1st Mário Soares (two terms);
 2nd Alfredo Nobre da Costa;
 3rd Carlos Mota Pinto;
 4th Maria de Lourdes Pintasilgo;
 5th Francisco Sá Carneiro;
 (interim) Diogo Freitas do Amaral – Deputy Prime Minister;
 6th Francisco Pinto Balsemão (two terms);
 1st Mário Soares (third term);
 7th Aníbal Cavaco Silva (three terms);
 8th António Guterres (two terms);
 9th José Manuel Barroso;
 10th Pedro Santana Lopes;
 11th José Sócrates (two terms);
 12th Passos Coelho (two terms);
 13th António Costa (three terms);

Prime minister's residence

Just behind the main building of the Assembly of the Republic, there is a mansion that serves as residence and office for the prime minister of Portugal. The mansion, dated from 1877, was built within the garden of the old monastery that held the Portuguese parliament. It has been the prime minister's official residence since 1938, when Salazar moved in. Although it is the official residence of the prime minister, not all incumbents have lived in the mansion during their term in office.

António Costa, current prime minister, doesn't live in the residence, but is said to in 2023.

List of prime ministers of Portugal

Term of office in years

Graphical timeline (since 1974)

See also
Leader of the Opposition (Portugal)
President of Portugal

References

External links
Official Website of the Prime Minister of Portugal

Government of Portugal
1834 establishments in Portugal
Articles which contain graphical timelines